{{Infobox station
| name        = Kurobe-Unazukionsen Station
| native_name = 黒部宇奈月温泉駅
| native_name_lang = ja
| type        = 
| style = JR West
| image       = Kurobe-Unazukionsen Station.jpg
| alt         = 
| mlanguage   = 
| caption     = The east side of Kurobe-Unazukionsen Station in January 2017
| other_name  = 
| address     = 3210-3 Wakaguri, Kurobe City, Toyama Prefecture
| country     = Japan
| coordinates = 
| operator    = 
| line        = 
| distance    =  from 
| platforms   = 2 side platforms
| tracks      = 2
| connections = Shin-Kurobe Station
| structure   = 
| code        = 
| status      = Staffed (Midori no Madoguchi)
| website     = 
| opened      = 
| rebuilt     = 
| closed      = 
| former      =  
| passengers  = 
| pass_year   = 
| map_type    = Japan Toyama Prefecture#Japan Kanto Chubu Kansai#Japan
| services    = {{Adjstn|system1=JR West|line1=Hokuriku Shinkansen|left1=Toyama|type1=Hakutaka|right1=Itoigawa|note-mid1={{SLL||#FF4500}}}}
}}
 is a railway station on the high-speed Hokuriku Shinkansen line in Kurobe, Toyama, Japan, operated by West Japan Railway Company (JR West).  Shin-Kurobe Station on the Toyama Chihō Railway Main Line is connected to the station by a walkway.

Lines
Only semi-fast Hakutaka'' Tokyo-to-Kanazawa services stop at Kurobe-Unazukionsen, with a roughly hourly service in each direction.

Station layout
The station consists of elevated platforms for the Hokuriku Shinkansen, with exits located on the east, west, and south sides of the station building.

Platforms
The elevated shinkansen platforms consist of two 312 m long side platforms serving two tracks. The platforms are fitted with chest-high platform edge doors.

Facilities
The station has a "Midori no Madoguchi" staffed ticket office. Toilets are located on the ground floor, and waiting rooms and smoking rooms are provided on both of the platforms.

History

The name combines the name of the city of Kurobe with Unazuki Onsen, a nearby hot spring resort, and the base to ride The Kurobe Gorge Railway.

Kurobe-Unazukionsen station opened for service on the Hokuriku Shinkansen on 14 March 2015.

Surrounding area
 Shin-Kurobe Station on the Toyama Chihō Railway Main Line
 Hokuriku Expressway Kurobe Interchange

See also
 Kurobe Station
 List of railway stations in Japan

References

External links

 JR West station information 
 Kurobe-Unazukionsen Station (City of Kurobe) 

Railway stations in Toyama Prefecture
Hokuriku Shinkansen
Stations of West Japan Railway Company
Railway stations in Japan opened in 2015
Kurobe, Toyama